Daulatpur Union is a union parishad of Daulatpur Upazila, in Kushtia District, Khulna Division of Bangladesh. There are 23 villages and 19 mouzas in the union.

References

External links
 

Unions of Khulna Division
Unions of Daulatpur Upazila, Kushtia
Unions of Kushtia District